These are the list of female leaders, ministers or head of ministry-level agencies within the government of the Republic of China.

 denotes the first female minister of that particular department.

See also
Cabinet
Cabinet of Taiwan
Politics of Taiwan

External links
 List of female cabinet ministers of Taiwan

Taiwan
Ministers
Cabinet